Samantha Barendson  (born 16 April 1976) is a French poet born in Spain to an Argentinian mother and an Italian father. She currently lives in Lyon. She speaks four languages and identifies as Franco-Italo-Argentinian. She was selected by the European project "Versopolis" to attend several poetry festivals in Europe. She is member of The union of poets who will die someday, whose purpose is to promote poetry for everyone and everywhere.  In March 2015, Barendson received the French poetry "René Leynaud" award for her poetry book "Le citronnier" (The lemon tree), which details her investigation into the life of her late father.

References 

20th-century French poets
1976 births
Living people